Identity change describes the intentional changes to an identity document or digital identity. The topic is of particular interest in "faceless" financial transactions and computer security.  There are several different parties who may initiate the change:

 A first party. the original bearer of an identity may initiate the change
 A second party, who wishes to use the identity, may initiate the change
 A third party may initiate an identity change
 In some instances, multiple parties cooperate to change an identity.

Identity change can be categorized in several ways: 

 Identity takeover (identity theft / identity fraud)
 Identity delegation
 Identity exchange
 Identity deletion
 Identity restoration

See also
 Identity management
 Biometrics
 Witness protection

References

Sources
Top Five Reasons Why People Change Their Identity
ID-related Crime: Towards a Common Ground for Interdisciplinary Research
Myth Of Identity Change

Identity management